Breen is a surname. Notable people with the surname include:

 Abs Breen (born 1979), English DJ, member of the band Five
 Barry Breen (born 1948), Australian footballer
 Bobby Breen (1927–2016), American actor and singer
 Carol Breen (born 1986), Irish footballer
 Chris Breen (ice hockey) (born 1989), Canadian ice hockey player
 Claire Breen, New Zealand law academic
 Craig Breen (born 1990), Irish rally driver
 Dan Breen (1894–1969), IRA member and Fianna Fáil politician
 David Breen (born 1985), Irish hurler
 Edward D. Breen, American business executive
 Edward G. Breen (1908-1991), American politician
 Gary Breen (born 1973), Irish footballer
 George Breen (born 1935), American freestyle swimmer
 Harry Breen, Northern Irish police officer
 Jim Breen (born 1947), American linguist
 John Breen (RAF officer) (1896–1964), World War II Royal Air Force commander
 Joseph Breen (1890–1965), American film censor, founded the Legion of Decency in 1934
 Joe Breen, Canadian football player
 Kate Breen (1869-1937), Irish nationalist
 Kelly J. Breen (born 1969), American horse trainer
 Kelly Breen (politician) (born 1977), American state legislator from Michigan
 Marie Breen (1902–1993), Australian Senator
 Mike Breen, American sportscaster
 Matthew Breen, American journalist
 Neil Breen (born 1958), American filmmaker and actor
 Olivia Breen (born 1996), British athlete
 Patrick Breen  (born 1960), American actor, playwright and screenwriter
 Shannon Breen (born 1989), American football player
 Suzanne Breen, Northern Ireland editor for the Sunday Tribune
 T. H. Breen, American historian
 Walter Breen (1928–1993), numismatist and pederast
 Vegard Breen (born 1990), Norwegian cyclist